Sigulda parish is an administrative unit of the Sigulda Municipality, Latvia.

  - parish administrative center

References 

Parishes of Latvia
Sigulda Municipality